Società Sportiva Dilettantistica Argentina Arma is an Italian football club, based in Arma di Taggia, Liguria. The team currently plays in Serie D and  it is the team more representative of the province of Imperia with S.S.D. Unione Sanremo.

History 

The club was founded in 1928 as Arma Juve.

It was promoted for the first time to Serie D in the 2013–14 season, after winning the play-off of Eccellenza Liguria with A.S.D. Magra Azzurri and after an ascent started in Promozione in the 2012–13 season.

In the 2014–15 season, in its first league in Serie D, it was ranked 15th and then was saved.

In the 2015–16 and in the 2016–17 season also in Serie D it was ranked respectively 5th and 8th.

Colors and badge
The colors of the team are red and black.

Honours 

Eccellenza:
Winner (1): 2013–14

References

1928 establishments in Italy
Association football clubs established in 1928
Football clubs in Liguria